Captain Francis Walter Despard Twigg OBE (1883-1951) was a senior officer in the Royal Navy.  He was made OBE in 1919 for valuable services in Command of HMS Lysander as a Senior Officer of Convoy Escorts.  In 1946 he was awarded the Legion of Merit, Degree of Legionnaire.

Life
Francis Walter Despard Twigg was born in Chatham, Kent, on 17 February 1883.  He was the son of Surgeon George Despard Twigg (RN) and educated at Bedford Modern School.

Twigg was made Commander of HMS Dee between 1913 and 1915, and later trained in signalling duties at the Portsmouth Signalling School. Twigg was appointed Commander of HMS Lysander in 1917, and Captain of HMS Spindrift in 1919. He was made Captain of Destroyer Stormcloud in 1919, Captain of HMS Godetia between 1922 and 1925, and later Captain of HMS Greenwich.

Twigg was made OBE in 1919 for valuable services in Command of HMS Lysander as a Senior Officer of Convoy Escorts.  In 1946 he was awarded the Legion of Merit, Degree of Legionnaire.

References

1883 births
1951 deaths
People from Chatham, Kent
Royal Navy officers of World War I
Officers of the Order of the British Empire
Legionnaires of the Legion of Merit
People educated at Bedford Modern School